A standpipe is a freestanding pipe fitted with a tap which is installed outdoors to dispense water in areas which do not have a running water supply to the buildings.

Use
In the United Kingdom, an "Emergency Drought Order" permits a water company to shut off the primary water supply to homes, and to supply water instead from tanks or standpipes in the streets. This was done in some areas during the 1976 heat wave, for example.

In some Middle Eastern, Caribbean and North African countries a standpipe is used as a communal water supply for neighbourhoods which lack individual housing water service. In areas such as Morocco, standpipes often yield unreliable service and lead to water scarcity for large numbers of people.

Gallery

References

Water supply